Brénaz is a former commune in the Ain department in eastern France. On 1 January 2019, it was merged into the new commune Arvière-en-Valromey.

Geography
The commune lies west of the Grand Colombier (Ain).

Population

See also
Communes of the Ain department

References

Former communes of Ain
Ain communes articles needing translation from French Wikipedia
Populated places disestablished in 2019